The pitted stonefish (Erosa erosa), also known as the Pacific monkey-fish, is a species of venomous ray-finned fish, a stonefish be longing to the subfamily Synanceiinae of the family Scorpaenidae, the scorpionfishes and their relatives. It is the only species in the monotypic genus Erosa and is found in the eastern Indian Ocean and the western Pacific Ocean.

Taxonomy 
The pitted stonefish was first formally described as Synanceia erosa in 1829 by the French zoologist Georges Cuvier with the type locality given as “Seas of Japan”. In 1839 William John Swainson placed it in the monotypic genus Erosa. The genus is considered, by some, to include the daruma stinger (Dampierosa daruma).  The genus Erosa is classified within the tribe Synanceiini which is one of three tribes in the subfamily Synanceeinae within the family Scorpaenidae. However, other authorities regard Synanceiidae as a valid family and the Synanceiini as the subfamily Synanceiinae. Erosa means “gnawed” or “eaten away”, an allusion to the dimpled surfaces of the bones.

Description
The pitted stonefish has a large head which has a rounded profile, there is a bony hump above the eyes with a deep pit on the nape. The snout is very short giving the head a nealy vertical anterior profile. This species has 14 spines and 9 soft rays in the dorsal fin and 2 spines and 5 or 6 soft rays in the anal fin. The overall colour is varies from reddish to orange or brown motTled with white. There mat be dark crossbands and lines of irregular shaped white spots on the pectoral, pelvic, anal and caudal fins.

Distribution and habitat
The pitted stonefish is found in the Indo-Pacific from southern Japan south to Australia and has been recorded from Korea, China, Taiwan, the Philippines, Indonesia, New Caledonia and Tonga. In Australia it is found from Exmouth Gulf in Western Australia to Moreton Bay in Queensland.

Biology
The pitted stonefish has venomous spines in its fins.

References

Synanceiini
Marine fish genera
Taxa named by William John Swainson
Taxa named by Georges Cuvier